Bayla, is a coastal town along the Guardafui Channel in the northeastern Bari region of Somalia. It is the capital of the Bayla District.

History
Bayla is located at the headland of Ras Ma'bar (or Cape Ma'bar). It historically served as an important landmark for sailors voyaging between the Arabian Peninsula and Horn of Africa.

A coastal community, Bayle is noted for its various beden, or ancient design sewn boats constructed without nails.

The town sustained heavy damage from the tsunami that followed the 2004 Indian Ocean earthquake.

Administration
In October 2015, the Puntland government in conjunction with the local Kaalo NGO and UN-HABITAT launched a new regional census to gather basic information in order to facilitate social service planning and development, as well as tax collection in remote areas. According to senior Puntland officials, a similar survey was already carried out in towns near the principal Garowe–Bosaso Highway. The new census initiative is slated to begin in the Bayla District, in addition to the Eyl District and Jariban District.

Demographics
Bayla has a population of around 16,700 inhabitants. The broader Bayla District has a total population of 14,376 residents.

Education
According to the Puntland Ministry of Education, there are 13 primary schools in the Bayla District. Among these are Rasul-Macbar, Kulule, Caris and Qoton.

Notes

References
Bayla, Somalia

Populated places in Bari, Somalia